Euchelus dampierensis is a species of sea snail, a marine gastropod mollusk in the family Chilodontidae.

References

External links
 To World Register of Marine Species

dampierensis
Gastropods described in 1994